Kožuchovce is a village and municipality in Stropkov District in the Prešov Region of north-eastern Slovakia.

History
In historical records the village was first mentioned in 1618.

Geography
The municipality lies at an altitude of 352 metres and covers an area of 6.146 km2. It has a population of about 73 people.

References

External links
 

Villages and municipalities in Stropkov District
Šariš